Judge Phillips may refer to:

Beth Phillips (born 1969), judge of the United States District Court for the Western District of Missouri
Gregory A. Phillips (born 1969), judge of the United States District Court for the Western District of Missouri
Harry Phillips (judge) (1909–1985), judge of the United States Court of Appeals for the Sixth Circuit
James Dickson Phillips Jr. (1922–2017), judge of the United States Court of Appeals for the Fourth Circuit
John Finis Philips (1834–1919), judge of the United States District Court for the Western District of Missouri
Layn R. Phillips (born 1952), district judge of the United States District Court for the Western District of Oklahoma
Orie Leon Phillips (1885–1974), judge of the United States Court of Appeals for the Tenth Circuit
Percy W. Phillips (1892–1969), judge of the United States Tax Court
Thomas W. Phillips (judge) (born 1943), judge of the United States District Court for the Eastern District of Tennessee
Virginia A. Phillips (born 1957), judge of the United States District Court for the Central District of California

See also
Justice Phillips (disambiguation)